Alexis Márquez Rivas (born March 25, 1989) is a Venezuelan swimmer, who specialized in butterfly events. He represented his nation Venezuela at the 2008 Summer Olympics, and currently holds a short course Venezuelan record in the 200 m butterfly (1:59.77) at the 2011 Copa de España Clubes Segunda Division in Castellón de la Plana, Spain. 

Marquez competed for Venezuela in the men's 200 m butterfly at the 2008 Summer Olympics in Beijing. Leading up to the Games, he touched with a runner-up time in 2:00.89 to beat the FINA B-cut (2:01.80) at the Latin Cup in Serravalle, San Marino. Swimming on the outside in heat two, Marquez rallied from behind at the start to edge out Puerto Rico's Douglas Lennox-Silva by 0.44 of a second on a late charge for the fifth spot with a 2:01.25. Marquez failed to advance to the semifinals, as he placed thirty-sixth overall in the prelims.

References

External links
NBC Olympics Profile

1989 births
Living people
Venezuelan male swimmers
Olympic swimmers of Venezuela
Swimmers at the 2008 Summer Olympics
Male butterfly swimmers
Swimmers at the 2011 Pan American Games
Sportspeople from Caracas
Pan American Games competitors for Venezuela
20th-century Venezuelan people
21st-century Venezuelan people